In Great Britain, the term North–South divide refers to the economic, cultural and political differences between Southern England and Northern England, or sometimes between southern England and the rest of Great Britain including the Midlands of England, Wales and Scotland. In mainstream interpretation, the divide cuts through The Midlands. The term has been widened to include the whole United Kingdom, with Northern Ireland included as part of "the North".

Existence
The North–South divide is not an exact line, but one that can involve many stereotypes, presumptions and other impressions of the surrounding region relative to other regions.

The existence of the North–South divide is fiercely contested. Some sources claim it exists but also that it is even expanding. For example, a report in 2001 found that North East England, North West England and Scotland had poorer health levels than South.

The same data have been interpreted otherwise to indicate only a very small difference.

Indeed, results are highly dependent on the categories chosen for evaluation. As a generalisation, the following tend to indicate that there is some sort of north–south divide:

Health conditions, which are generally seen as being worse in the north, though spending on health care is higher
House prices, which are higher in the south, particularly the South-East.
Earnings, which are higher in the south and east.
Government spending per person on drivers of growth such as transport, infrastructure and R&D, which is far higher in the South-East.
Political influence.
Devolution of powers to local government. London has a directly elected mayor with control over public transport whilst most Northern cities do not have mayors and have transport policies decided by the UK government.

However, many Middle class and affluent areas are located near most major cities north of the divide, and conversely there are pockets of large deprivation in the south. A 2004 report into wealth by Barclays Bank also highlighted the anomaly that the wealthiest parliamentary constituency outside London was actually Sheffield Hallam. A 2012 survey by Halifax stated that whilst nine of the top ten most expensive places to live in Britain were in the south of England, Edinburgh was ninth on the list, ahead of Salisbury.

This has led some commentators to suggest that other divisions, such as class or ethnicity might be more important.

There is also controversy as to what constitutes the South given that it extends much farther longitudinally than the North of the country; some commentators have placed the West Country (in this case, Bristol, Somerset, Devon and Cornwall) into a region of its own because the poverty in some of these areas is often as widespread as it is in the North.

Politics

In political terms, the South, and particularly South East England (outside inner London) and East of England, is largely centre-right, and supportive of the Conservative Party, while the North was, at least until the 2019 general election, more supportive of the Labour Party.

The metropolitan areas of northern England (as also in Southern England) are still strongly supportive of Labour, even with the recent trends away from Labour in the north. This is shown in that Labour dominate Manchester, Liverpool, Newcastle, Hull and Sheffield.

During the 1980s, Labour councils in the North were often openly defiant against the policies of the Thatcher governments. Examples include Liverpool under the Militant tendency and Sheffield under David Blunkett.

Support for the Liberal Democrats, and many of the smaller parties, is generally more equally spread out across the UK. There is some criticism of this analysis in the West Country which, until the 2015 general election, had consistently provided a solid base for the Liberal Democrats, particularly in places which suffer from many of the same economic problems as the North.

Some city councils in southern England tend to swing politically between Labour and Conservative control, despite being located in a wider region dominated singularly by the Conservatives. Examples include Southampton City Council and Plymouth City Council.

In 2019, many traditionally Labour seats in the so-called red wall were won by the Conservatives, many for the first time. Historically, constituencies in the North Midlands and Northern England tended to vote for the Labour Party. It is noteworthy the erosion of the Labour Party vote in the north and midlands began in the 2001 general election, with a continual trend of decline until 2017. However, the trend returned strongly in 2019. In 2014, political scientists Matthew Goodwin and Robert Ford documented the erosion by UKIP of the Labour-supporting working-class vote in their book, Revolt on the Right. This eroded vote was arguably capitalised upon by the Conservatives with their pro-Brexit stance.

In 2021, the Conservative government launched a Levelling up policy to address the North–South divide as part of a broader objective. In September 2021 the Ministry for Housing, Communities and Local Government was renamed the Department for Levelling Up, Housing and Communities under Secretary of State Michael Gove, and a Levelling Up Taskforce was created to define the policy in more detail.

The Scottish National Party have been the most supported in Scotland since the 2007 Scottish Parliament election.

See also
North–South divide
North–South divide in England
North–South divide (Wales)
Scottish Highlands and Scottish Lowlands
North Britain and South Britain
Lloegyr
Trap-bath split

Footnotes

Geography of the United Kingdom
Economy of the United Kingdom
Social phenomena
Economic inequality
Social history of the United Kingdom
Unemployment in the United Kingdom
divide UK
divide UK